Yeh Hai India is a 2017 Indian Hindi-language drama film written and directed by Lomharsh. Produced by Sandeep Choudhary under the banner of DLB Films Pvt. Ltd. The film is based on its writer's real life journey to several countries and his observations on the thoughts and views of other people about India. It features Gavie Chahal, Deana Uppal in the lead roles. Music by Raja Hassan.

Plot
Yeh Hai India, follows the story of a 25-year-old NRI, who is born and raised in U.K and shares the same stereotype views of India, which is known for its vast population, pollution and poverty. However, protagonist finds new development in media or probably an "other side of same coin" of India, which is also known for successful mars mission in first attempt, a nation which proudly holds title "God of Cricket" for Sachin Tendulkar, who is again an Indian and a nation which is known for its holy generosity with icons like Mother Teresa". The film was shot in Rajasthan, Bihar, Mumbai, Uttar Pradesh, Madhya Pradesh and Gujarat.
The official motion poster of Yeh Hai India released in Jaipur.

Cast 
 Gavie Chahal as NRI 
 Deana Uppal as British Girl 
 Mohan Agashe as PM
 Mohan Joshi as Tourism Minister
 Surendra Pal
 Ashutosh Kaushik
 Antara Banerjee
 Bikramjeet Kanwarpal
karmveer Choudhary as Darshan Singh

Soundtrack 
The title track video song voiced by Shahid Mallya was released online on April 30, 2019. The mp3 album of the film was unveiled on April 30, 2019 which consists of 5 songs.

Track listing

Controversies 
A concern has been raised by some of the dialogues in the movie by Saba Sikander, one of them being "Lekin humain sirf ye kehna hai ki wakai main agar kanoon aur vyavastha sabke liye ek samaan nahi hai toh bana dijiye ek naya Pakistan"().She said that "(...) Pakistan does have objections on this film.", to which Lom said that the comment doesn't hold ground due to freedom of expression given to artists.

Promotion 
Producer Sandeep Choudhary meets PM Narendra Modi at his visit to Japan and discuss about the film. Team also invited PM to watch the film. Gavie Chahal drive a scooter painted with Yeh Hai India in Jaipur during the promotions. It is first time in Bollywood history that Baba Ramdev supported a film.

Awards 
 Best Film Award to Yeh Hai India at FOG Film Festival, USA 2017
 Best Director Award to Lomharsh at FOG Film Festival, USA 2017
 Special Jury Mention Award at JIFF, India

References

External links 

2017 films
Indian drama films
Films shot in Mumbai